The Euscyrtinae are a subfamily of crickets, in the family Gryllidae (subfamily group Podoscirtinae), based on the type genus Euscyrtus.  They are terrestrial and omnivorous and can be found in: Central America, Africa, Asia and Australia.

Genera
The Orthoptera Species File lists:
 Beybienkoana Gorochov, 1988
 Burrianus – monotypic – B. pachyceros Chopard, 1962
 Euscyrtodes Gorochov, 1987
 Euscyrtus Guérin-Méneville, 1844
 Merrinella Otte & Alexander, 1983
 Patiscodes Gorochov, 1988
 Patiscus Stål, 1877
 Proturana Otte, 1987 – monotypic – P. subapterus (Chopard, 1970)
 Tozeria – monotypic – T.  muwitiwallina Otte & Alexander, 1983
 Turana (insect) Otte & Alexander, 1983

References

External links
 

Orthoptera subfamilies
Ensifera
crickets